Marlen Esparza (born July 29, 1989) is an American professional boxer who held the 
WBC female flyweight title since June 2021 and the WBA and The Ring female flyweight title since April 2022. As an amateur she became the first American woman to qualify for the Olympics in the first year that women's boxing was an Olympic event, going on to win a bronze medal in the women's flyweight division at the 2012 Olympics in London.

Life 
Esparza who is of Mexican descent, graduated from Pasadena High School in Pasadena, Texas in 2007. Esparza won a bronze medal at the 2006 Women's World Boxing Championship, gold at the 2014 AIBA Women's World Boxing Championships, and bronze at the 2016 AIBA Women's World Boxing Championships.

Esparza has an endorsement deal with CoverGirl cosmetics. She also appeared in a Spanish-language commercial for Coca-Cola. In addition, she collaborated with animal rights group PETA and posed in an ad to urge the public to speak up for abused animals.

Esparza was the subject of Soledad O'Brien's 2011 CNN documentary In Her Corner: Latino in America 2. She was the subject of an extensive profile in the June 2012 issue of The Atlantic which discusses in detail her childhood, education, and her intense commitment to competition and training.

Marlen Esparza was voted the Houston Fighter Of The Year (an award that encompasses both professional and amateur boxers) for 2010, 2011, 2012, 2013 and 2014. In December 2016 she signed a contract with Golden Boy Promotions, and she made her pro debut on ESPN's March 23, 2017 opening card of a multi-year deal with Golden Boy. She won that fight, which was against Rachel Sazoff.

She faced Seniesa Estrada for the WBA interim female flyweight title on November 2, 2019, at the MGM Grand Garden Arena in Paradise, Nevada. The bout formed part of the undercard for Canelo Álvarez vs Sergey Kovalev. The bout was stopped at the end of the ninth round, on the advice of the ringside doctor, after Esparza suffered a cut in the fifth round from an accidental clash of heads, handing her the first defeat of her professional career by way of a unanimous technical decision.

Professional boxing record

References

External links

 
 
 
 
 
 Marlen Esparza  Video produced by Makers: Women Who Make America

 

1989 births
Living people
Baptists from Texas
Boxers from Houston
American women boxers
American boxers of Mexican descent
LGBT boxers
LGBT people from Texas
American LGBT sportspeople
Boxers at the 2012 Summer Olympics
Olympic bronze medalists for the United States in boxing
Medalists at the 2012 Summer Olympics
Pasadena High School (Pasadena, Texas) alumni
AIBA Women's World Boxing Championships medalists
Pan American Games medalists in boxing
Pan American Games silver medalists for the United States
Boxers at the 2015 Pan American Games
Medalists at the 2015 Pan American Games
21st-century American women
Bisexual sportspeople
Flyweight boxers
World flyweight boxing champions
World Boxing Association champions
World Boxing Council champions
The Ring (magazine) champions